The Man Who Came Back is a 1924 silent film drama directed by Emmett J. Flynn and starring George O'Brien and Dorothy Mackaill. It was produced and released by Fox Film Corporation.

Fox brought the story to the screen again in 1931 as an early talkie, The Man Who Came Back.

Plot

Cast
George O'Brien - Henry Potter
Dorothy Mackaill - Marcelle
Cyril Chadwick - Captain Trevelan
Ralph Lewis - Thomas Potter
Emily Fitzroy - Aunt Isabel
Harvey Clark - Charles Reisling
Edward Peil, Sr. - Sam Shu Sin
David Kirby - Gibson
James Gordon - Captain Gallon
Walter Wilkinson - Henry Potter (4 years of age)
Winston Miller - Henry Potter (12 years of age)

Preservation status
Incomplete or fragment held at Narodni Filmovy Archive and incomplete print at UCLA Film & Television.

References

External links

1924 films
American silent feature films
Fox Film films
Films directed by Emmett J. Flynn
American black-and-white films
Silent American drama films
1924 drama films
Films based on American novels
1920s American films